The 1975–1976 FIRA Trophy was the 16th edition of a European rugby union championship for national teams.

The tournament was won by France, with a Grand Slam. Italy finished in 2nd, with a single loss to France, ahead of Romania, which finished in 3rd, with two losses. France awarded caps only in its game with Romania.

First division 
Table

 Netherlands relegated to division 2 (for worst point difference)
Results

Second Division 

Table

Morocco promoted to Division 1 (more points scored than the winner of Pool 2)

Results

Pool 2 
Table

Results

Bibliography 
 Francesco Volpe, Valerio Vecchiarelli (2000), 2000 Italia in Meta, Storia della nazionale italiana di rugby dagli albori al Sei Nazioni, GS Editore (2000) .
 Francesco Volpe, Paolo Pacitti (Author), Rugby 2000, GTE Gruppo Editorale (1999).

References

External links
 FIRA-AER official website

1975–76 in European rugby union
1975–76
1975 rugby union tournaments for national teams
1976 rugby union tournaments for national teams